Karmaflow: The Rock Opera Videogame is an interactive rock opera video game developed by Dutch studio BaseCamp Games and features singers from bands such as DragonForce, Cradle of Filth, Epica, Sonata Arctica, and Arch Enemy. The symphonic sound of the score is performed by the Metropole Orkest.

Cast 
Bas Dolmans (Ex-Xystus) as The Protokeeper
Charlotte Wessels (Delain) as The Narrator
Lisette van den Berg (Scarlet Stories) as The Data Chamber

World 1
Alissa White-Gluz (Arch Enemy) as The Muse
Marc Hudson (DragonForce) as The Conductor

World 2
Mark Jansen (Epica) as The Guide
Lindsay Schoolcraft (Cradle of Filth) as The Shaman

World 3
Mariangela Demurtas (Tristania) as The Bird Goddess
Tony Kakko (Sonata Arctica) as The Sun Brother
Elize Ryd (Amaranthe) as The Moon Sister

World 4
Henning Basse (MaYaN) as The Hero
Daniël de Jongh (Textures) as The Heart

Epilogue
Simone Simons (Epica) as The Destroyer
Dani Filth (Cradle of Filth) as The Creator

Music

The soundtrack of this game, performed by Metropole Orkest, was released on April 30, 2015.

Track listing
"Main Theme" – 1:22
"The Essence of Grief" - 1:20
"The Muse and the Conductor" - 5:26
"The Essence of Despair" - 1:57
"The Guide" - 6:10
"The Essence of Jealousy" - 1:18
"The Bird Goddess" - 2:36
"The Twins" - 5:31
"The Essence of Greed" - 1:19
"The Heart" - 6:13
"The Creator and The Destroyer" - 8:21
"The Sacrifice" - 3:10

References

External links

Karmaflow (Official website)
https://steamcommunity.com/app/317940
http://pcmac.games/games/karmaflow-the-rock-opera-videogame
https://www.giantbomb.com/karmaflow-the-rock-opera-videogame/3030-45897/
https://www.rockpapershotgun.com/2014/07/03/rock-opera-game-karmaflow/#more-217493

2015 video games
Adventure games
Music video games
Rock operas
Video games developed in the Netherlands
Windows games
Unreal Engine games
Windows-only games